The 2008 season of the Segunda División Peruana season was the 63rd edition of the second tier of Federación Peruana de Futbol. There were 10 teams in play. Only 7 teams from last season remain. Sport Águila, from the 2007 Copa Perú, was promoted to this season's edition, and Total Clean and Deportivo Municipal were relegated from the first division. Unión Huaral was not relegated last season but they dropped out and participated in the Copa Perú. Each team will play 27 games. The teams will first play home-and-away games. The teams will then play each other for a third time. The team that will play at home is going to be determined by the results of the first two games: the one with the better aggregate will play at home. The winner and runner-up of this season will be promoted to the Peruvian First Division. The team that finishes last will be relegated to the 2009 Copa Perú. The promoted teams will be replaced by the third and fourth place teams of the Copa Perú.

Teams

Table

Standings

Results

First and second rounds

Third round

References

External links
 RSSSF

Peruvian Segunda División seasons
2